Labor of Love may refer to:

 The act of doing something as a hobby

Film, television, plays
 Labor of Love (1998 film), a 1998 television film
 Labor of Love (2015 film), an upcoming film by M. Night Shyamalan
 "Labor of Love" (Once Upon a Time), an episode of Once Upon a Time
 Labour of Love (play), a 2017 play by James Graham
 Labor of Love (TV series), a reality television series

Music
 Labor of Love (Radney Foster album)
 Labor of Love (Janie Frickie album)
 Labor of Love (Sammy Kershaw album)
 Labor of Love (Spinners album), 1980
 Labour of Love, an album by UB40
 Labour of Love (Frente! EP), 1993, or the title track
 Labour of Love (Woodlock EP), 2014
 "Labour of Love" (song), a song by Hue and Cry